The 1968–69 Drake Bulldogs men's basketball team represented Drake University in the 1968–69 college basketball season. The team was led by eleventh-year head coach Maury John. In 1967–68, the Bulldogs finished 18–8 (9–7 in the Missouri Valley Conference). They were also trying to make their first NCAA tournament appearance since as well as their first postseason appearance since their National Invitation Tournament appearance in 1964.

Regular season 
The Bulldogs were 12–1 at home as well as 8–3 on the road and 6–1 at neutral locations. With their third-place finish in the NCAA Tournament Drake had their best NCAA finish up to that point, and as of the start of the 2022–2023 season. On December 27–28, 1968 Drake played in the Dallas Classic in Dallas, Texas against Minnesota and Southern Methodist. Drake was ranked in the AP Top 20 Poll on several occasions during the season. Drake was ranked 18th during the week of January 7, 1969. Drake was once again ranked 11th on March 4, 1969. On March 8, 1969 Drake won a MVC playoff game 77–73 in Wichita, Kansas to determine the conference champion.
A documentary on the 1968–69 Drake Basketball team was made in 2004 by filmmaker Jacob Adams of Impossible Productions and is available from his website. Most of the UCLA—Drake game was recreated with an old coach's film and radio play by play. Intercut are commentaries by Drake players and coaches.

Missouri Valley Conference standings

Roster

Player statistics 
Note: GP= Games played; RPG = Rebounds per Game; PPG = Points per Game

Schedule

Rankings

NBA Draft

References 

Drake
Drake Bulldogs men's basketball seasons
NCAA Division I men's basketball tournament Final Four seasons
Drake
Drake Basketball, Men's
Drake Basketball, Men's